Deborah Retief Memorial Hospital is a government-run district hospital located in Mochudi, one of the larger villages in Botswana with a population of 44,815 people in 2011. It is situated in the Bakgatla tribal region, in Kgatleng District, about 37 km (23 mi) northeast of Gaborone. The village lies several kilometres from the main Gaborone–Francistown road, and can be accessed through a short turn at Pilane. Botswana. The hospital was established in September 1932.

History

References

External links 
 Botswana Ministry of Health 

Hospital buildings completed in 1932
Hospitals in Botswana
Hospitals established in 1932